Year 1173 (MCLXXIII) was a common year starting on Monday (link will display the full calendar) of the Julian calendar.

Events 
 By place 

 Europe 
 January 5 – Bolesław IV (the Curly), High Duke of Poland, dies after a 27-year reign. He is succeeded by his half-brother Mieszko III (the Old), and as duke of Sandomierz in Lesser Poland by Casimir II (the Just).
 King Canute I (Knut Eriksson) extends his rule after the death of co-ruler Kol – which includes also Östergötland. He becomes the unopposed sole-ruler of Sweden. Canute is supported by Earl Birger Brosa.
 Abu Yaqub Yusuf, caliph of the Almohad Caliphate, re-populates the western Andalusian city of Beja. But it is rapidly abandoned, a sign of the quick demographic weakening of the Muslims in the peninsula.

 England 
 Spring – Henry the Young King withdraws to the French court, marking the beginning of the Revolt of 1173–74, in which former Queen Eleanor of Aquitaine and her sons rebel against her ex-husband King Henry II.
 October 17 – Battle of Fornham: Rebel forces are defeated while fording the River Lark. Flemish mercenaries are driven into the nearby swamps by the English royalists under Lord Richard de Luci (or Lucy).

 Egypt 
 Summer – Saladin leads an expeditionary army against the Bedouin tribes in Oultrejordain to secure a route between Egypt and Syria. He raids the region at Kerak Castle.
 Pro-Fatimid rising in Upper Egypt led by Kanz al-Dawla, governor of Aswan, is crushed by Saladin's brother Al-Adil.

 China 
 The Qiandao era ends and the Chunxi era begins during the reign of Emperor Xiao Zong of the Song Dynasty.
South India

 Sinhalese king Parakramabahu the Great gains a decisive victory by invading the Chola Empire as an ally of the Pandyas, capturing Tondi and Pasi regions.

 By topic 

 Art and Leisure 
 August 8 – The construction of a campanile, which will become the Leaning Tower of Pisa, begins.
 Algebraic chess notation is first recorded.

 Agriculture 
 King Béla III invites Cistercian and Premonstratensian monks to Hungary. They introduce advanced agricultural methods in the realm (approximate date).

 Religion 
 February 21 – Thomas Becket is canonized by Pope Alexander III. His tomb in Canterbury Cathedral becomes a shrine and a popular pilgrimage destination.
 Peter Waldo, French spiritual leader, is converted to Christianity and founds the Waldensians.
 The Great Mosque of al-Nuri in Mosul is completed (approximate date).

Births 
 May 21 – Shinran, founder of Shin Buddhism (d. 1263)
 October 31 – Kujō Ninshi, Japanese empress (d. 1239)
 December 23 – Louis I, duke of Bavaria (d. 1231)
 Diya al-Din al-Maqdisi, Arab Sunni scholar (d. 1145)
 Frederick I, count of Berg-Altena (approximate date)
 Isabella, countess of Gloucester (approximate date)
 Kamal al-Din Isfahani, Persian poet and writer (d. 1237)
 Kolbeinn Tumason, Icelandic chieftain (d. 1208)
 Llywelyn the Great, king of Gwynedd (d. 1240)
 Louis IV (the Young), French nobleman (d. 1226)
 Rostislav II, Grand Prince of Kiev (d. 1214)
 Tankei, Japanese Buddhist sculptor (d. 1256)
 Walter Devereux, Norman nobleman (d. 1197)

Deaths 
 January 5 – Bolesław IV (the Curly), duke of Poland
 February 10 – Muiredach Ua Cobthaig, Irish bishop
 March 10 – Richard of Saint Victor, Scottish theologian
 August 9 – Najm ad-Din Ayyub, father of Saladin
 August 13 – Nerses IV, Catholicos of Armenia (b. 1102)
 October 15 – Petronilla, queen of Aragon (b. 1136)
 November 7 – Uijong, Korean ruler Goryeo (b. 1127)
 Benjamin of Tudela, Spanish Jewish traveler (b. 1130)
 Benoît de Sainte-Maure, French poet and writer
 Fujiwara no Ikushi, Japanese empress (b. 1146)
 Hemachandra, Indian poet and polymath (b. 1088)
 Kol of Sweden, Swedish ruler of Östergötland
 Narasimha I, Indian ruler of the Hoysala Empire
 Raimbaut d'Aurenga, French troubadour (b. 1147)
 Rajaraja II, Indian ruler of the Chola Dynasty
 Reginald Fitzurse, English nobleman (b. 1145)
 Roger de Clare, 2nd Earl of Hertford (b. 1116)
 Vladimir III, Grand Prince of Kiev (b. 1132)

References